Barrytown is a hamlet (and census-designated place) within the town of Red Hook in Dutchess County, New York, United States.  It is within the Hudson River Historic District, a National Historic Landmark, and contains four notable Hudson River Valley estates: Edgewater, Massena, Rokeby, and Sylvania.

History

In 1791, Peter and Eleanor Contine kept store at what would later be called Barrytown Landing.

Barrytown was named in honor of President Andrew Jackson's Postmaster General, William Taylor Barry, who served in that capacity from 1829 to 1835.

The majority of the houses in Barrytown were built in the mid to late nineteenth century, often to house workers at the local estates and accompanying farms.

Estates
 "Massena" was first part of Livingston Manor and after the Lower Manor was split off, part of Clermont. Upon the death of his mother, Margaret Beekman Livingston, widow of Judge Robert Livingston of the Livingston family, John R. Livingston inherited land, much of which would later become Barrytown. (His sister Alida Livingston Armstrong inherited a section to the south, which would become "Rokeby"). John Livingston built a mansion in the style of a French chateau and called the estate "Massena", after André Massena, one of Napoleon's military commanders. In 1860, New York City merchant, John Aspinwall, purchased "Massena" as a summer home. Aspinwall was a supporter of John Bard and a significant benefactor to St. Stephen's College. In 1874, Jane Aspinwall established the Church of St. John the Evangelist in Barrytown in her husband's memory. Livingston's original mansion burned down in 1885, and Mrs. Aspinwall replaced it with a Victorian Gothic house designed by William Appleton Potter. When the Brothers of the Christian Schools' property in Amawalk was condemned to make way for the New Croton Reservoir, they relocated their novitiate to Pocantico. Around 1929, the Rockefeller family purchased the property. With the proceeds from the sale, the brothers of the New York District purchased the Massena estate at the northern section of the hamlet. They moved the novitiate there and established St. Joseph's Normal Institute as a teacher training facility. The Institute closed in 1969. In 1975 the property was bought by the Unification Church, where its Unification Theological Seminary is located. As of August 2018, the property was again for sale.
 In 1824, John R. Livingston gave the 250-acre "Edgewater" property to his daughter Margaretta and her husband, Rawlins Lowndes Brown. Brown died in 1852 and the following year, his widow sold the estate to New York financier Robert Donaldson Jr., who commissioned architect Alexander Jackson Davis to add an octagonal library wing. It is now owned by a preservation trust.
 Elizabeth Chanler Chapman was the daughter of John Winthrop Chanler and Margaret Astor Ward, and great-granddaughter of William Backhouse Astor, Sr. She grew up at "Rokeby". In 1902, she purchased "Edgewater", just to the north,  from the Donaldson estate. In 1905, she and her husband, John Jay Chapman moved into a new house designed by the architect Charles A. Platt, built on the hill above Edgewater and known as Sylvania. Around 1933, the Chapman's moved into a cottage built on the grounds of Sylvania they named "Good Hap".  
 "La Bergerie" (later called "Rokeby") was established about 1811 by General John Armstrong Jr., who purchased the land from his father-in-law, Judge Robert Livingston of Clermont. The Armstrongs raised sheep on the estate. Their daughter Margaret married William Backhouse Astor Sr. In 1835, the Astors purchased Rokeby and used it as a summer home.
 In September 1844, Laura Eugenia Astor, married merchant/financier Franklin Hughes Delano. As a wedding present, William Astor gave the couple the southernmost 100 acres of "Rokeby". The estate became known as "Steen Valetje" (which means "little stone valley" in Dutch).In 1849, the Astors and the Delanos commissioned German born landscape gardener Hans Jacob Ehlers to improve the grounds at "Rokeby" and "Steen Valetje", in the course of which he converted an old farm track into a woodland path called the "Poet's Walk" in honor of Washington Irving and Fitz-Greene Halleck who are said to have strolled there. It is now Poets' Walk Park, managed by Scenic Hudson.

David Johnson, of the Hudson River School, painted his View of the Hudson from Barrytown, New York in 1872.

Churches
The Episcopal Church of St. John the Evangelist was founded in 1874 by Jane Moore Breck Aspinwall in memory of her husband, John. The church was designed by William Appleton Potter.

The Sacred Heart Roman Catholic Church was established to serve the Irish Catholic population employed on the railroads and large estates. Prior to the building, they attended services across the river in Rondout and Saugerties, walking across the frozen river in winter or crossing by boat, weather permitting. On one occasion, a boat and its occupants narrowly missed a very tragic incident. Apparently, some members of the Donaldson family of Edgewater were on that boat. The Donaldson family donated the land for the church and cemetery at Barrytown. The cornerstone of the church was laid by Rev. Thomas S. Preston on October 17, 1875. Barrytown was a mission attended from St. Joseph's in Rhinecliff, by pastor James Fitzsimmons, until 1886 when Archbishop Corrigan appointed Rev. William J. McClure resident rector. The first burial in the Cemetery was November 23, 1886. The rectory was built in 1887.

In 1886, St. Sylvia's in Tivoli became a mission of Barrytown. As travelling to Barrytown proved hazardous in winter, in 1910, St. Christopher's in Red Hook was founded as a mission of Sacred Heart Parish. Sacred Heart once stood amid the bustle of rivercommerce, but over time, the population center shifted to Red Hook. Sacred Heart remained in use until 1969; it was suppressed as a parish in 1975. The building is now a private home.

Notable people associated with Barrytown 
The American architect Alexander Jackson Davis designed several structures in Barrytown, including the octagonal addition to the Edgewater main house and the estate's two octagonal gatehouses (1853), located across from each other on what is now Station Hill Road. The South gatehouse is home to Baroque cellist Christine Gummere.
The American essayist and critic John Jay Chapman, a descendant of Chief Justice John Jay and grandson of the abolitionist Maria Weston Chapman, lived in Barrytown. His second wife, Elizabeth Chapman, owned the Edgewater estate from 1902 until 1917, and may have lived there briefly before the couple built the Sylvania estate on adjacent land.
During the 1950s, the Nobel Prize-winning novelist Saul Bellow, while teaching at Bard College, rented lodgings at Sylvania, the estate belonging to Chanler Chapman, the son of John Jay Chapman; Chanler Chapman was the inspiration for the character "Henderson" in Bellow's 1959 novel Henderson the Rain King.
The author, playwright, screenwriter and journalist Gore Vidal lived at the Edgewater estate from 1950 to 1969, when he sold it to financier and preservationist Richard Jenrette. Vidal ran unsuccessfully for Congress from New York's 29th District (Dutchess County), using Edgewater as his base of operations; Eleanor Roosevelt campaigned for him.
During the 1950s, the reclusive film star Greta Garbo was a regular visitor to Barrytown, where she would stay with her friend Alan Porter.
The father of journalist Joan Walsh attended St. Joseph's Normal Institute in the late 1940s.
The financier and preservationist Richard Jenrette lived at the Edgewater estate from 1969 until his death in 2018.
 The artist Gary Hill lived on Station Hill Road from 1977 to 1984, initially as a tenant of artist/poet George Quasha and artist Susan Quasha, in whose Stained Glass Studio Hill's works were filmed, including Why Do Things Get in a Muddle? (Come On Petunia) (1984) He later returned to Barrytown to collaborate with poets George Quasha and Charles Stein.
The classics scholar and public intellectual James Romm lives in Barrytown and teaches at Bard College.
The author, translator, critic and New York Review of Books editor Daniel Mendelsohn lives in Barrytown.
 "Barrytown" is the name of a song recorded by Steely Dan on the 1974 album Pretzel Logic; Donald Fagen and the late Walter Becker, Steely Dan's leaders and songwriters, are alumni of nearby Bard College.

References

External links

 House Tour: Barrytown, N.Y. in The New York Times

Hamlets in New York (state)
Red Hook, New York
Poughkeepsie–Newburgh–Middletown metropolitan area
Hamlets in Dutchess County, New York
New York (state) populated places on the Hudson River